Sielce Lewe  is a village in the administrative district of Gmina Maków, within Skierniewice County, Łódź Voivodeship, in central Poland.

The village has a population of 150.

References

Sielce Lewe